LP Aquarii is a pulsating variable star in the constellation of Aquarius that varies between magnitudes 6.30 and 6.64. The position of the star near the ecliptic means it is subject to lunar occultations.

References

M-type giants
Slow irregular variables
Aquarius (constellation)
Durchmusterung objects
214983
112078
Aquarii, LP